Golden ram or Golden Ram may refer to:

Culture
Chrysomallos, mythical golden-fleeced ram
The Golden Ram, name for the Russian Guild of Film Critics awards from 1998 ton 2004

Mascots
West Chester Golden Rams of West Chester University of Pennsylvania 
Albany State Golden Rams of Albany State University
Golden Rams of Spring-Ford Area School District

See also
Gold ram, a variety of Ram cichlid, a freshwater fish
Golden Fleece (disambiguation)